Chaudhry Muhammad Zaka Ashraf (Punjabi, ; born 9 September 1952) is a Pakistani executive who was the president of the Zarai Taraqiati Bank Limited (ZTBL). He was appointed chairman of the Pakistan Cricket Board on 15 October 2011 by the President of Pakistan and took the charge on 27 October 2011. However, on 10 February 2014, the Prime Minister of Pakistan Nawaz Sharif dissolved the PCB governing board and sacked him from the chairmanship of PCB. In August 2012, he was elected as chairman Development Committee of Asian Cricket Council.

Early life and education
Zaka has been associated with Pakistan Peoples Party since 1970, under the government of Zulfikar Ali Bhutto.
While he was in college, he developed close ties with future politician Asif Ali Zardari, due to their similar political views.

Ashraf is an alumnus of the Sadiq Public School, Bahwalpur, and the Cadet College Petaro, from where he graduated  with a bachelor's degree in 1973.

Chairman of Pakistan Cricket Board

Suspension by the Court

On 28 May 2013, the Islamabad High Court stopped Zaka Ashraf from working as Pakistan Cricket Board Chairman on the petition of that the election of Zaka as PCB chairman was malafide by the former coach of Pakistan Army Cricket team. Moreover, the IHC had barred him from performing his duties on the grounds that the process of his election was not transparent. On 24 June 2013, the case adjourned till further notice.

Re-appointment

The Islamabad High Court reinstated Zaka Ashraf as chairman of the Pakistan Cricket Board on 15 January 2014. The decision to reinstate Ashraf was taken by a two-member division bench consisting of Justice Noorul Haq Qureshi and Justice Riaz Ahmed Khan. The court accepted the intra-court appeal against the decision by a single-member bench of IHC consisting of Justice Shaukat Aziz Siddiqui. On 19 July 2013, the Islamabad High Court had declared the appointment of Ashraf "illegal" and directed the acting PCB chief Najam Sethi to hold elections within 90 days.

References

Living people
Pakistani bankers
Pakistani businesspeople
Pakistani chief executives
Pakistan People's Party politicians
Pakistani sports executives and administrators
People from Bahawalpur District
Cadet College Petaro alumni
Sadiq Public School alumni
1952 births
Pakistan Cricket Board Presidents and Chairmen
Punjabi people